Samuel Addison Bishop (1825 – 1893) was a settler of the Owens Valley and is the namesake of Bishop Creek in Inyo County, California. He fought as a first sergeant in the Mariposa Battalion and later was a banker and a founder of the San Jose streetcar system.

Biography
Bishop was born in Albemarle County, Virginia on September 2, 1825. Seeking gold, he headed to California in 1849. In 1851 he fought in the Mariposa War and aided in the capture of the Ahwahnechee.

In 1861, Bishop drove over 500 cattle into the Owens Valley and founded San Frances Ranch on what would later be named Bishop Creek, about three miles southwest of the present town of Bishop. The ranch was named after his wife, Frances Elle Young, who is reported to be the first white woman to live in the valley.  The ranch provided food for the Aurora Mining District in nearby Nevada. The Bishops only stayed on the ranch for about 18 months before moving to Kern County where Samuel became one of the county’s first Supervisors when its government was created in 1866. Two years later the Bishops moved to San Jose. There, Samuel became a banker and secured a franchise for constructing a streetcar line. San Jose remained his home until his death on June 3, 1893.

Legacy
Bishop Creek was named after Samuel and subsequently the town of Bishop was named after the creek.

References

California pioneers
History of Inyo County, California
Owens Valley